This is a list of episodes based on the Ojarumaru anime series. The series is produced by NHK Enterprises, animated by Studio Gallop, and directed by Akitaro Daichi. It has been airing on NHK Educational TV since October 5, 1998.

The series follows the adventures of a 5-year-old Heian era prince named Ojarumaru Sakanoue who accidentally time-warps to modern day Japan and befriends a 7-year-old boy named Kazuma Tamura. After being allowed to live with the Tamura family, Ojarumaru tries to understand modern Japan's culture and makes many new friends, while avoiding the Oni Child Trio's efforts to retrieve a scepter he stole from Great King Enma.

Episodes

Series 8 (2005)

Series 9 (2006)

Series 10 (2007)

Series 11 (2008)

Series 12 (2009–2010)

Series 13 (2010)

Series 14 (2011)

Series 15 (2012)

Series 16 (2013)

Series 17 (2014)

Series 18 (2015)

Specials

Home media

VHS

DVD

References

External links
 Full list of episodes 

Ojarumaru